Rock Werchter 2010 ran from 1 July until 4 July 2010 at the Rock Werchter site in the Belgian village of Werchter.

Line-up

Day 1: Thursday 1 July

Day 2: Friday 2 July

Day 3: Saturday 3 July

Day 4: Sunday 4 July

References
Official website

Rock Werchter
2010 music festivals